Art Blakey was an American jazz drummer and bandleader. "Art Blakey" and "Jazz Messengers" became synonymous over the years, though Blakey led many non-Messenger recording sessions.
In addition to the 76 albums which he recorded as a leader or co-leader of the Jazz Messengers, Blakey also led 10 studio albums, 3 live albums and 4 compilation sessions. A relentless performer, he continued to record as a sideman on dozens of albums, throughout his career—frequently for Messengers alumni. He also led several percussion-centric albums with many of his peers.

Studio albums 
{| class="wikitable"
|-
! style="width:20em" |Album
! style="width:30em" |Album details
|-
| Blakey
|
 Released: 1954
 Recorded: May 20, 1954
 Label: Emarcy (MG 26030)
 Format: 10" LP
|-
| Orgy in Rhythm, Vol. 1 and 2
|
 Released: 1957
 Recorded: March 7, 1957
 Label: Blue Note (BLP 1554 [Mono], BST 1554 [Stereo]; BLP 1555)
 Format: LP
|-
| Art Blakey Big Band
|
 Released: 1958
 Recorded: December, 1957
 Label: Bethlehem (BCP 6027)
 Format: LP
|-
| Holiday for Skins, Vol. 1 and 2
|
 Released: 1959
 Recorded: November 8, 1958
 Label: Blue Note (BLP 4004, BLP 4005)
 Format: LP
|-
| The African Beat
|
 Released: November 1962
 Recorded: January 24, 1962
 Label: Blue Note (BLP 4097 [Mono], BST 84097 [Stereo])
 Format: LP
|-
| A Jazz Message
|
 Released: February 1964
 Recorded: July 16, 1963
 Label: Impulse! (A 45)
 Format: LP
|-
| Hold On, I'm Coming
|
 Released: 1966
 Recorded: May 12 and May 27, 1966
 Label: Limelight (LM 82038)
 Format: LP
|-
| Killer Joe
| with George Kawaguchi
 Released: 1982
 Recorded: December 4, 1981
 Label: Union Jazz (ULP 5001)
 Format: LP
|-
| Feel the Wind
|with Freddie Hubbard
 Released: 1989
 Recorded: October 31 & November 1, 1988
 Label: Timeless (SJP 307)
 Format: LP/CD
|-
| Bluesiana Triangle
|
 Released: 1990
 Recorded: March, 1990
 Label: Windham Hill Jazz (WD 0125)
 Format: CD
|-
| Just Coolin'''
|
 Released: July 17, 2020
 Recorded: March 8, 1959
 Label: Blue Note (64201)
 Format: CD, Vinyl LP
|}

Live albums

Compilation albums

The Jazz Messengers albums

Albums recorded as a side musician

Filmography
 1965 Live in '65 (DVD)
 1983 Jazz at the Smithsonian 1986 At Ronnie Scott's London (Video)
 1995 The Jazz Messenger (Video/DVD)
 1998 Art Blakey's Jazz Messengers 2001 Jazz Life, Vol. 2 2003 Modern Jazz at the Village Vanguard 2003 Live from Ronnie Scott's (DVD)
 2003 Live at the Smithsonian 2004 Live at Village Vanguard''

Notes

References

External links
Art Blakey discography at the Jazz Discography Project, GFDL

Jazz discographies
 
Discographies of American artists